Luis Pérez may refer to:

Sportspeople

Association football
Luis Pérez (footballer, born 1906) (1906–1963), Mexican footballer
Luís Alonso Pérez (1922–1972), Brazilian football manager
Luis Pérez (Colombian footballer) (born 1957), Colombian footballer
Luis Pérez (footballer, born 1964), Chilean football player and manager
Luis Pérez (footballer, born 1969), Chilean football player and manager
Luis Pérez (footballer, born 1971), Spanish footballer
Luis Ernesto Pérez (born 1981), Mexican footballer
Luis Pérez (footballer, born 1995), Spanish footballer

Other sports
Luis Pérez-Sala (born 1959), Spanish race-car driver
Luis Pérez García (born 1966), Spanish racing cyclist
Luis Alberto Pérez-Rionda (born 1969), Cuban athlete
Luís Pérez Companc (born 1972), Argentine rally driver
Luis Deines Pérez (born 1973), Puerto Rican boxer
Luis Pérez Rodríguez (born 1974), Spanish cyclist
Luis Alberto Pérez (born 1978), Nicaraguan boxer
Luis Pérez Romero (born 1980), Spanish cyclist
Luis Pérez (pitcher) (born 1985), Dominican pitcher
Luis Pérez (Negro leagues), Negro leagues baseball player
Luis Perez (American football) (born 1994), American quarterback

Others
Luis Eduardo Pérez (1774–1841), interim president of Uruguay
Luís Guillermo Peréz (born 1951), Colombian human rights lawyer
Luis Pérez Ortiz (born 1955), Puerto Rican politician
Luis Fernando Pérez (born 1977), Spanish classical pianist